Lady of the Tropics is a 1939 American drama film directed by Jack Conway, starring Robert Taylor, Hedy Lamarr, and Joseph Schildkraut.

Plot
While visiting French Indochina with his girlfriend and her family on her father's yacht, freeloading American playboy Bill Carey falls in love with Manon DeVargnes, a beautiful, local woman of mixed race background he meets in Saigon.  Manon is also being romantically pursued by local businessman Pierre Delaroch.  Bill eventually marries Manon.  When Bill is unable to find employment in Saigon, Delaroch secretly arranges to have Bill employed by his company.

Cast

 Robert Taylor as Bill Carey 
 Hedy Lamarr as Manon DeVargnes 
 Joseph Schildkraut as Pierre Delaroch 
 Gloria Franklin as Nina 
 Ernest Cossart as Father Antoine 
 Mary Taylor as Dolly Harrison 
 Charles Trowbridge as Alfred Z. Harrison 
 Frederick Worlock as Colonel Demassey 
 Paul Porcasi as Lamartine 
 Marguerita Padula as Madame Kya 
 Cecil Cunningham as Countess Berichi 
 Natalie Moorhead as Mrs. Hazlitt

Reception
According to MGM records, the film made $1,042,000 in the US and Canada and $491,000 elsewhere, resulting in a profit of $99,000.

Bibliography
 Barton, Ruth. Hedy Lamarr: The Most Beautiful Woman in Film. University Press of Kentucky, 2010.
 Marchetti, Gina. Romance and the "Yellow Peril": Race, Sex, and Discursive Strategies in Hollywood Fiction. University of California Press, 1993.

References

External links

 
 
 
 

1939 films
1939 romantic drama films
American romantic drama films
Films scored by Franz Waxman
Films directed by Jack Conway
Films set in French Indochina
Films set in Vietnam
Metro-Goldwyn-Mayer films
Films with screenplays by Ben Hecht
American black-and-white films
1930s English-language films
1930s American films